Vincenzo Licciardi (born June 27, 1965) is the boss of the Licciardi clan, and one of the main leaders of the Secondigliano Alliance, a Camorra crime syndicate operating in Naples and the surrounding Campania region.

Biography

Early career
Born and raised in the Neapolitan suburb of Secondigliano, Licciardi was from a powerful family of Camorristi going back a few generations. His father was a well known guappo or local boss in the 1950s. In 1994, Licciardi became the regent of the Licciardi clan whose traditional strongholds included not only its home base in the district of Secondigliano, but also to Scampia, Chiaiano, Miano and San Pietro a Patierno. The clan was previously headed by his brother, Gennaro Licciardi, nicknamed  'a scigna (The monkey), who died of blood poisoning while in the prison of Voghera on August 3, 1994.

However, an arrest in the mid-nineties prevented him from taking control and propelled his sister Maria Licciardi into the top spot as boss of the Licciardi clan, and therefore, as head of the Secondigliano Alliance, a coalition of powerful Camorra clans which controls drug trafficking and the extortion rackets against shopkeepers in many Neapolitan suburbs. Under her leadership, the Secondigliano Alliance become more organized, secretive, sophisticated and consequently more powerful.

Camorra boss
After the arrest of his sister on June 15, 2001, Licciardi took over as a supreme head of the Secondigliano Alliance along with Paolo Di Lauro and Edoardo Contini. Apart from the dominant Licciardi clan, the alliance consisted of the Contini, Di Lauro, Mallardo and Lo Russo clans. The preceding gang wars between the many Camorra clans that constituted the alliance, led to a severe weakening of the confederation as well as unwanted police attention on its activities. Like his sister, Vincenzo was very cautious and never used the phone to communicate with his underlings, instead using small handwritten encrypted notes, similar to the Pizzini used by the Corleonesi boss, Bernardo Provenzano. Throughout his reign, Licciardi's main activity covered the illegal trafficking of clothing, which due to a sophisticated international network, which has also allowed the laundering of money from other criminal activities such as drug trafficking and extortion.

Evading justice
Licciardi became wanted by the Italian police in 2003, after having served a year in prison for a previous conviction. The following year, in July 2004, an arrest warrant was issued against him for conspiracy to commit murder, and a list of other crimes. He was also added to the list of thirty most dangerous fugitives in Italy. In 2005, an international warrant was issued and his name was included in the "special program of research" in the direction of the Central Criminal Police. While a fugitive, Licciardi had managed to evade capture on at least three occasions, once fleeing through the network of sewers. Several sightings of Licciardi were reported abroad, particularly in Portugal, Spain and France. He allegedly travelled to these places in order to maintain contacts with the Magliari clan, which controls many drug routes in Europe.

Capture
After five years on the run, Licciardi was arrested on February 7, 2008, in Cuma, near the city of Naples. He was found hiding in the apartment of distant relatives, where he lived with his wife. During his arrest, he surrendered peacefully and offered no resistance. The detection of the hide-out was made possible through the use of sophisticated technologies. Licciardi's arrest came around the same time as that of a massive anti-Mafia sweep in Italy and the United States. A large anti-Mafia operation code-named "Old Bridge" involved arrest warrants issued against a total of ninety mafiosi and mob associates of key Italian and US families who controlled drug trafficking between the two sides of the Atlantic.

When Licciardi was escorted to prison by police officials, there was a turmoil by Licciardi's relatives as well as the relatives of other Camorristi, shouting, jostling and moments of tension. After his arrest, Licciardi was succeeded by Gennaro Cirelli as boss of the clan.

Piero Grasso, the national anti-Mafia prosecutor commented: "Licciardi's arrest is another success in the capture of fugitives of opposing clans that were involved in the feud in Secondigliano in recent years. There has moved forward in the complete destruction of the clan that up to today have caused dozens of deaths in the streets of Naples. The capture of Licciardi, for the brilliant way in which it was executed by the police, represents a step forward in the fight against the Camorra."

Aftermath
On June 15, 2008, his younger sister Patrizia and his brother-in-law Eduardo Marano, known as dino dinuccio were arrested by the Carabinieri and charged with the extortion of an entrepreneur from Casoria. The entrepreneur was contemplating suicide, and had complained to the Carabinieri of the extortion attempt. The two had long been controlled by the policemen who were later arrested, due to the entrepreneur's collaboration.

On July 9, 2008, five months after his arrest, 44 people linked to the Licciardi clan were arrested in a raid by the Naples police. The 44 people arrested were accused of conspiracy to murder, drug trafficking, possession of weapons, forgery and attempted aggravated robbery. Vincenzo Licciardi, who was already in prison at the time, was also charged with the aforementioned crimes. The blitz was conducted as a result of investigations that led to the arrest of Vincenzo Licciardi.

An anti-Camorra raid was also undertaken by the Guardia di Finanza in Naples and the surrounding town of Frosinone, who seized property, commercial companies, shares of stakes in companies, apartments, buildings, land, cars, motorcycles, with a total estimated value of 300 million euros. In the aftermath of the raids, the police implemented an order for remand in prison handed down by the prosecution of Naples, at the request of local anti-Mafia directorate, against Licciardi and several affiliated criminal organizations that control the drug trafficking and extortion rackets in North Naples.

References

External links
 arresto del latitante vincenzo licciardi - AOL Video

1965 births
Living people
Licciardi clan